The 2011–12 Vancouver Canucks season was the 42nd season in the modern Canucks history. The Vancouver Canucks were the defending Western Conference champions and three time defending Northwest Division champions. The Canucks opened the regular season against the Pittsburgh Penguins at home on October 6. Their final regular season game was held at Rogers Arena against the Edmonton Oilers on April 7, 2012. The Canucks entered the season expected to again contend for their first ever Stanley Cup. The Canucks struggled out of the gate, hovering around .500 until roughly the 20 game mark due to weak defensive play and a slow start from Roberto Luongo. The Canucks then rebounded, playing their best hockey of the season from the end of November until the beginning of January. The team dominated much like they did the season prior during this stretch, as goals came in bunches and the offense was backed up by strong goaltending from the tandem of Luongo and Cory Schneider. The peak of the Canucks' season came on January 7, 2012, in a game against the Boston Bruins, a 2011 Stanley Cup Final rematch. The Canucks prevailed 4–3 in a hard-fought playoff atmosphere, and they seemed to state to the hockey world that they would be heard from again come playoff time. The winning ways continued for the rest of the season, but the team did not play with the same heart they played with that January afternoon again. The Canucks often played down to their competition, barely beating some of the weakest teams in the league as the offense seemed to disappear. The Canucks pulled a shocking deal at the trade deadline, trading blue-chip prospect Cody Hodgson to the Buffalo Sabres for a skilled, but unproven prospect Zack Kassian. While Kassian should eventually emerge as a solid NHLer, this deal was probably pulled too soon as the offensive mojo disappeared but the team was lucky to have outstanding goaltending that led them to their second consecutive Presidents' Trophy on the final day of the regular season when they defeated the Edmonton Oilers. Despite entering the playoffs as the top seed in the Western Conference, the Canucks were upset in the first round of the Stanley Cup Playoffs in five games by the eight-seeded Los Angeles Kings. This was the third consecutive season the Canucks lost in the playoffs to the eventual Stanley Cup Champion.

Offseason

NHL Entry Draft

The 2011 NHL Entry Draft was held June 24–25, 2011, at the Xcel Energy Center in Saint Paul, Minnesota. The Canucks selected eight players including Nicklas Jensen with their first-round draft choice, 29th overall. On day two of the entry draft the Vancouver Canucks traded their second-round draft choice to the Minnesota Wild for two picks in later rounds. In total, Vancouver selected eight players including David Honzík, Alexandre Grenier, Joseph LaBate, Ludwig Blomstrand, Frank Corrado, Pathrik Westerholm and Henrik Tommernes. In total, none would become regular NHL players, with Corrado playing the most games with 76 appearances across three teams.

Minor League affiliations
On June 21, 2011, True North Sports & Entertainment, the owners of the Manitoba Moose received Board of Governors approval to purchase and re-locate the Atlanta Thrashers. The Thrashers moved to Winnipeg, Manitoba to replace the Manitoba Moose. The Moose announced that they were moving to St. John's and would become the AHL affiliate of the Winnipeg Jets. As a result, the Canucks were left without an affiliate temporarily. On June 27, 2011, the Vancouver Canucks signed a two-year affiliation agreement with the Chicago Wolves. The Vancouver Canucks announced that Craig MacTavish would be the new coach for the Wolves on August 1 after Claude Noel, who coached the Manitoba Moose during the 2010–11 season, was hired by the Jets.

In addition, on April 8, 2011, it was announced that the Chilliwack Bruins of the Western Hockey League would be moving their franchise to Victoria, British Columbia.  The sale of the Chilliwack Bruins to RG Properties was completed and made official on April 20 by the WHL. The Victoria Royals replaced the Victoria Salmon Kings and began play in the 2011–12 WHL season. RG Properties, who also owned the Victoria Salmon Kings, opted to fold the Salmon Kings franchise at the conclusion of the 2010–11 ECHL season.  As a result, the Canucks were left without an ECHL minor league affiliate. The Salmon Kings spent five years as the ECHL affiliate of the Vancouver Canucks.

On September 22, the Vancouver Canucks announced that it had signed an ECHL affiliation agreement with the Kalamazoo Wings.

Preseason
Training camp began for the rookies on September 9 and included two days of on-ice training sessions followed by a four-game Young Stars tournament featuring prospects from other teams including the Calgary Flames, Edmonton Oilers, San Jose Sharks and Winnipeg Jets. Among the players were four that were selected from the 2011 Entry Draft. Nicklas Jensen, David Honzik, Alexandre Grenier and Frank Corrado all took part in the Canucks rookie training camp and Young Stars tournament. LaBate did not participate in the camp because his college semester had begun while Blomstrand, Westerholm and Tommernes were in the midst of training camp for their own Swedish hockey clubs.

The Vancouver Canucks main training camp started on September 16. Several veteran NHL players were invited to the camp on a try-out basis. These players included Owen Nolan, Anders Eriksson, Niko Dimitrakos and Todd Fedoruk. However, none of the invites were able to secure a contract with the club.

The Canucks played a total of eight preseason games where they finished with a record of 3–5. Much of the Vancouver Canucks roster were returning members from the 2010–11 season with the exception of Ryan Kesler, Mason Raymond, Christian Ehrhoff and Raffi Torres. Both Kesler and Raymond were recovering from injuries sustained in the prior season while Ehrhoff and Torres had changed teams, through trade and free agency respectively, during the offseason.

Citing the shortened offseason due to their appearance in the Stanley Cup Finals, the Vancouver Canucks management and coaching staff decided to give a majority of the veterans rest. As a result players guaranteed roster spots in the regular season, such as Daniel and Henrik Sedin only played in two preseason games.

Regular season
Like 2010–11 the Vancouver Canucks were met with extremely high expectations for the upcoming season. They entered 2011–12 as the defending Presidents' Trophy and Western Conference Champions. It was a record setting season that saw them rank first in the league in goals per game, goals against per game and power play percentage. Both Roberto Luongo and Cory Schneider were awarded the William M. Jennings Trophy for lowest goals against.

General consensus through various sports media outlets such as The Hockey News, Sports Illustrated, TSN and Sportsnet predicted that the Canucks would return to the Western Conference Finals or at least finish first in the Western Conference regular season.

October–November

The Vancouver Canucks began their season on October 6 when they hosted the Pittsburgh Penguins before embarking on a four-game road trip. Prior to the start of the home opener the Canucks organization held a ceremony to celebrate their 2010–11 season and to thank the police officers, firemen and volunteers who helped the city recover after the Stanley Cup riot. The game was supposed to be Sidney Crosby's third NHL game at Rogers Arena, and first hockey game since scoring the golden goal at the 2010 Winter Olympics but was unable to play as he was still recovering from a concussion. In the game, the Vancouver Canucks battled back from a 3–1 deficit but fell short in a shootout.

The club held a ceremony on October 18 prior to their game against the New York Rangers to honour the late Rick Rypien. Rypien played within the Vancouver Canucks organization for seven seasons, splitting time between the Canucks and the Manitoba Moose, before signing with the Winnipeg Jets during the summer. Rypien was found dead at his home in Crowsnest Pass, Alberta, on August 15. The Canucks wore a helmet decal in honour of Rypien during the season. The Canucks also ran a video tribute for former Ranger Derek Boogaard who also died during the offseason.

The Canucks struggled throughout the month of October which was punctuated by a significant trade. Mikael Samuelsson and Marco Sturm were traded to the Florida Panthers on October 22, just hours after the Canucks defeated the Minnesota Wild. In return, the Canucks acquired a third-round draft pick in the 2013 NHL Entry Draft and forwards David Booth and Steven Reinprecht. The month ended with a match up against the Washington Capitals that saw the Canucks prevail by a final score of 7–4. Alex Edler, Maxim Lapierre and Chris Higgins all registered two goals for Vancouver while Alexander Ovechkin also scored a pair of goals for Washington.

The month of November opened with a six-game road trip beginning in Calgary, where the Canucks won the game by a score of 5–1. The game saw Daniel Sedin score his 254th goal of his career to tie Pavel Bure for fourth all-time in Canucks goal scoring. However, the Canucks continued to battle inconsistency and were unable to sustain any momentum through the first two-thirds of the month where they compiled a record of 4–4 capped by a blowout loss to rival Chicago. The Canucks, led by Cory Schneider who originally replaced an injured Roberto Luongo, finished the month with five consecutive victories that included back-to-back shutouts for Schneider. During the winning streak head coach Alain Vigneault became the team's winningest coach when the team defeated Colorado on November 23.

Standings

Divisional standings

Conference standings

Schedule and results

Pre-season

Regular season

Detailed records

Playoffs

The Vancouver Canucks clinched the Presidents' Trophy for the second consecutive year, thus guaranteeing themselves home ice advantage for the duration of the playoffs. However, they were knocked out in the first round by the eventual Stanley Cup champion Los Angeles Kings.

Player statistics

Skaters

Note: GP = Games played; G = Goals; A = Assists; Pts = Points; +/− = Plus/minus; PIM = Penalty minutes

Goaltenders
Note: GP = Games played; GS = Game Starts; TOI = Time on ice (minutes); W = Wins; L = Losses; OT = Overtime losses; GA = Goals against; GAA= Goals against average; SA= Shots against; Sv% = Save percentage; SO= Shutouts

†Denotes player spent time with another team before joining Canucks. Stats reflect time with Canucks only.
‡Traded mid-season. Stats reflect time with Canucks only.

Updated after game on April 7, 2012

Awards and records

Records

Milestones

Awards

Draft picks
Vancouver's picks at the 2011 NHL Entry Draft in Saint Paul, Minnesota.

* An additional second-round draft pick was awarded to the Montreal Canadiens as compensation for failing to sign a first-round draft choice. Therefore, all picks after have been moved down by one. The New Jersey Devils forfeit a third-round draft pick, but league protocol retains the draft pick number so that subsequent draft numbers are unaffected.
1. These picks were acquired in a trade with the Minnesota Wild that sent the Canucks 60th overall pick for the 71st and 101st overall picks.

Transactions

Trades

Players signedWaivers

AcquiredFree agents signedFree agents lost

Farm teams
 The Chicago Wolves are the new Canucks' American Hockey League affiliate beginning in the 2011–12 season.
 The Kalamazoo Wings are the new Canucks' ECHL affiliate beginning in the 2011–12 season.

See also
 2011–12 NHL season

References

Vancouver Canucks season, 2011-12
Presidents' Trophy seasons
Vancouver Canucks seasons
Vancouver C